Camp Amal was an experimental camp of the Habonim youth movement.  Founded in 1948 on a rented site in Vermont, the camp was intended to give campers a thorough education in Hebrew, as opposed to simply using Yiddish or English, which were prominently in use at many Jewish camps at the time.  After an inauspicious beginning, the camp attracted wide praise in the Jewish educational community for its ability to teach campers Hebrew. First moving the camp to a site in Connecticut in 1950, Habonim, due to financial troubles, was forced to move the camp again several times, in 1951 to the Cream Ridge Farm, in 1952 to Camp Moshava, and in 1953 to share the campsite of Camp Galil in Pennsylvania. The sharing of one campground by two different camps turned out to be untenable, so Habonim discontinued Amal after 1953.  However, the camp influenced Habonim and other Jewish camping groups to start using and teaching Hebrew more aggressively at all their camps.

See also

 Habonim Dror

References
 "Amal in Retrospect" by Moshe Margalit in Adventures in Pioneering: Twenty-Five Years of Habonim Camping
"Galil" by Daniel Isaacman in Adventures in Pioneering: Twenty-Five Years of Habonim Camping

Amal
Youth organizations established in 1948
1948 establishments in Vermont
Organizations disestablished in 1953
1953 disestablishments in Pennsylvania